Chris Webb is a British sculptor of Portland stone. Originally a blacksmith, with work featured throughout London, Webb moved his attention to stone and has over 30 years experience in this medium.

Webb is a member of Rye Arts Club. He divides his time between his two studios in Somerset, England and the south of France.

Webb's most recent work includes the Kingfisher's Nest for Somerset Square, Taunton, England.

References

External links
Official website

Living people
English sculptors
English male sculptors
1954 births